Bremen Vier (English: Bremen Four) is a radio station from Radio Bremen for the city of Bremen and Bremerhaven in Bremen; it plays mostly pop music and has been operating for thirty years.

History 

The first broadcast by Bremen Four was on 1 December 1986 at 9:05 a.m. The first song was "Pop Muzik" by M, and the first host was Jürgen Büsselberg.

In December 2007 the company moved to a new radio station. The last track played was again "Pop Muzik", and the last host was Axel P. Sommerfeld. 

Hansawelle programming was broadcast in the mornings before 9 a.m. until April 1989, when the station's first morning show, Slip, began. From 1999 until 2008 the morning show was Der Dicke und der Dünne (The Fat and the Lean), hosted alternately by Krause and Marcus Rudolph. A new morning show began in January 2009, with Roland Kanwicher and Olaf Rathje, alternating with Jens-Uwe Krause and Tina Padberg.

Programming 
Bremen Vier broadcasts from 5 a.m. to 1 a.m. Overnight, the station plays ARD's Popnacht (Pop Night).

Hosts

Reception 
In Bremen, the station can be heard on 101.2 MHz at 100 kW; in Bremerhaven on 100.8 MHz at 25 kW. A live stream is available on Bremenvier.de.

References

External links
 

Radio Bremen
Radio stations in Germany
Radio stations established in 1986
1986 establishments in West Germany
Mass media in Bremen (city)